Obaid Al Jasmi, last name sometime spelled "Jasimi", (born August 9, 1981 in Abu Dhabi, United Arab Emirates) is a two-time Olympic swimmer from the United Arab Emirates. He swam for the UAE at the 2004 and 2008 Olympics. As of March 2012, he is attempting to qualify for his third Olympics.

He has swum for the UAE at:
Olympics: 2004 and 2008
World Championships: 2007, 2009, 2011
Asian Games: 2010
Short Course Worlds: 2010

Obaid and three of his brothers all swam at the 2010 Short Course Worlds in Dubai, UAE.

References

1981 births
Living people
Swimmers at the 2004 Summer Olympics
Swimmers at the 2008 Summer Olympics
Emirati male swimmers
Olympic swimmers of the United Arab Emirates
People from Abu Dhabi
Swimmers at the 2006 Asian Games
Swimmers at the 2010 Asian Games
Asian Games competitors for the United Arab Emirates